This is a list of members of the Western Australian Legislative Council from 14 May 1900 to 12 May 1902. The chamber had 24 seats made up of eight provinces each electing three members, on a system of rotation whereby one-third of the members would retire at each biennial election. The Constitution Act Amendment Act 1899, which took effect after the 1900 election, created two new electorates—Metropolitan-Suburban Province and South Province—which had their inaugural elections on 29 August and 5 September 1900 respectively with terms expiring in 1906, 1904 and 1902.

Notes
 On 3 December 1900, Central Province MLC Frederic Whitcombe resigned. Labor Party member Con O'Brien won the resulting by-election on 30 January 1901. He is generally regarded as the first Labor member of the Legislative Council, although John Drew who served in the first Labor Cabinet in 1904–1905 and later joined the Labor Party was elected eight months earlier.
 On 27 May 1901, North-East Province MLC Charles Sommers was appointed to the Ministry as Minister for Lands. He was therefore required to resign and contest a ministerial by-election, at which he was returned unopposed at the close of nominations on 6 June 1901.
 In March 1901, North-East Province MLC Alexander Matheson resigned to contest a seat in the Australian Senate. James Connolly won the resulting by-election on 12 June 1901.
 On 21 July 1901, South-West Province MLC William Spencer died. Ephraim Clarke won the resulting by-election on 21 August 1901.
 On 23 September 1901, East Province MLC Henry Lukin died. Frederick Crowder, who had lost his South-East seat 16 months earlier, won the resulting by-election on 30 October 1901.
 Following the failure of the Leake Ministry, a new Ministry led by Alf Morgans was sworn in, and on 21 November 1901, West Province MLC Matthew Moss was appointed Colonial Secretary. He was therefore required to resign and contest a ministerial by-election, at which he was defeated by Robert Laurie.
 On 23 December 1901, following the failure of the Morgans Ministry, a new Ministry led by George Leake was sworn in, and Metropolitan-Suburban Province MLC Adam Jameson was appointed as Minister for Lands. He was therefore required to resign and contest a ministerial by-election, at which he was returned unopposed at the close of nominations on 2 January 1902.

Sources
 
 

Members of Western Australian parliaments by term